Juhani Aataminpoika (born 31 July 1826 in Vesivehmaa, Asikkala – September 1854 in Suomenlinna), alias Kerpeikkari, was a Finnish serial killer. He killed 12 people in southern Finland between October and November in 1849. He has been characterized as the first serial killer in Finland.

Biography 
Juhani Aataminpoika left home at the age of 15, living a nomadic life and conducting small crimes. In October 1849, he was charged for stealing horses and imprisoned. During his imprisonment, he was taken from the Hämeenlinna prison to Hauho, where the court was to be held on his crimes. During the transportation, he escaped, starting a homicidal spree. In Lammi he killed the master and mistress of the Helisevä croft with a man named Kustaa Kratula. From there, he went back to his home in Heinola, where he killed his father and mother and their two children before fleeing to the forest.

Shortly afterwards, he killed a man to get his certificate to get a job at a canal site. Juhani Aataminpoika travelled to the Saimaa Canal, killing more people on the way. He didn't stay at the canal work site but killed a sailor in order to get his papers.

At the beginning of November, Aataminpoika had returned to Lammi, from which he left with his friend Antti Suikko to go to the Tyry croft in the village of Hattelmala. The men trashed the house, stealing their money and maiming the tenants. The elderly mistress of the house died later from her injuries but the others managed to survive the attack.

Shortly thereafter, on 20 November, Juhani Aataminpoika was caught in Palsa near Lammi and Padasjoki border. At the end of the trial following the recapture, the Vyborg Court of Appeal sentenced him to death. The sentence was upheld in the Senate's Department of Justice, but the Emperor commuted it to 40 lashes and a life imprisonment sentence. He was transferred in January 1853 to Suomenlinna and was kept there, chained to the wall, until his death in 1854.

Juhani Aataminpoika was also known by the nickname "Kerpeikkari", which is coined from Swedish word skarprättare, meaning 'executioner'. He was famous in his own time, but his actions were eventually forgotten and he did not end up with the same level of fame as for example Matti Haapoja. In the 2000s, however, he once again sparked an interest for researchers.

Film 
A movie about Juhani Aataminpoika's life is still in the planning stages. The script is written by Kari Hietalahti, and the film is to be directed by Peter Franzén. Earlier plans were to see the movie released by the autumn of 2017, but as of 2022 the film has yet to be financed, putting it in production limbo.

See also 
 List of serial killers by country
 Matti Haapoja

Sources 

  Hämeenlinnan Kaupunkiuutisten artikkeli vuodelta 2003 (Archive.org)

References

Literature

External links 

 Kaijus Ervasti: / Juhani Aataminpoika Kansallisbiografia-verkkojulkaisu (maksullinen). Helsinki:  Suomalaisen Kirjallisuuden Seura.    
 Balladi Juhani Aataminpojasta
 Täällä kitui suomalainen sarjamurhaaja (Suomenlinna), Hs.fi

1826 births
1854 deaths
Familicides
Finnish mass murderers
Finnish serial killers
Male serial killers
Serial killers who died in prison custody